Muckanaghederdauhaulia is a  townland in the civil parish of Kilcummin in County Galway, Ireland. It is in the poor law union of Oughterard in the barony of Moycullen.

Name and location

It was formerly regarded as the longest place name (in English) in Ireland (22 letters), but awareness of longer names has challenged Muckanaghederdauhaulia. There was a hamlet within the townland which had the same name in Irish (Muiceanach idir Dhá Sháile), but a shorter English name, Mucknasalia. The 1911 census enumerator spelled it Muckenaghedderdahaulia (23 letters) though the published report uses the 22-letter spelling.

The townland lies on a low, boggy peninsula in Camus Bay and can be reached by turning west from the R336 road at Cinn Mhara, or by going northwest on the R374 road out of Casla, then turning onto Bóthar na Scratóg and going north.

Population

The population recorded in those census reports which provided figures at townland level were as follows:

In popular culture 
The area is mentioned in Georges Perec's novel Life: A User’s Manual: "In between, there had been the little harbour of Muckanaghederdauhaulia, not far from Costelloe, in Ireland’s Camus Bay...".

See also

 List of longest placenames in Ireland

References

Townlands of County Galway